Othman Ali Hila. Al-Busaidi (born 5 January 1992) is an Omani sprinter specialising in the 400 metres. He represented his country at the 2014 Asian Games.

International competitions

Personal bests

Outdoor
200 metres – 21.91 (+1.4 m/s, Doha 2015)
400 metres – 47.05 (Taipei 2017)

References

1992 births
Living people
Omani male sprinters
Athletes (track and field) at the 2014 Asian Games
Asian Games competitors for Oman
Competitors at the 2013 Summer Universiade
Competitors at the 2017 Summer Universiade